Battle camp or variant, may refer to:

 military camp, a camp for a military force in preparation for battle
 training camp for military recruit training, a camp to train people to become warriors
 Battle Camp, a locality on the Palmer River on Cape York in Queensland, Australia
 Battle Camp, Cairns, Queensland, Australia
 Battle Camp Sandstones, a region of the Cape York Peninsula tropical savanna, Queensland, Australia
 Battlecamp Road, Hope Vale, Queensland, Australia

See also

 Battle (disambiguation)
 Camp (disambiguation)
 War camp (disambiguation)
 boot camp (disambiguation)
 Combat Camp (disambiguation)
 Quilombo (disambiguation)
 Eko (disambiguation)